The 2014 Yamaguchi gubernatorial election was held on 23 February 2014 to elect the next governor of , a prefecture of Japan in the Chūgoku region of the main island of Honshu.

The outgoing governor, Shigetaro Yamamoto, suffered from lung cancer, which led him to resign on 9 January 2014. An election was organized for 23 February to replace him. He died on 15 March 15 2014.

Candidates 
Tsugumasa Muraoka, former official of the Internal Affairs and Communications Ministry, endorsed by LDP and Komeito.
Tsutomu Takamura, former member of the House of Representatives (for the DPJ), endorsed by the People’s Life Party.
Naoko Fujii, former member of the Shunan Municipal Assembly, for the JCP.

Results

References 

2014 elections in Japan
Yamaguchi gubernational elections